The Whitney Boomerang DW200 is a two-seat, fixed tricycle gear general aviation airplane, originally designed for flight training, touring and personal use. It can be seen in active service at Darwin International, Brisbane's Archerfield and Perth's Jandakot general aviation airports.

History

The Whitney Boomerang was designed by C.W. "Bill" Whitney as a replacement for the aging two-seat training aircraft fleets. The type certificate was granted on the 18th of December 2007 making the Boomerang only the 5th Australian aircraft to be granted an FAR 23 certificate. The Whitney Boomerang was produced by Dean Wilson Aviation located at Kingaroy Airport until 2011, when the company went into receivership. The machine has performed at several airshows and has also featured in media reports having made the trans-Tasman journey to New Zealand.

On Friday May 27, 2011 an advertisement appeared in the Aviation supplement of The Australian newspaper inviting expressions of interest in acquiring the assets of the companies manufacturing the Whitney Boomerang. The assets were listed as the Type Certificate, aircraft, plant and equipment, parts and tooling for aircraft manufacture and the hangar housing production facilities at Kingaroy, Queensland. The advertisement was inserted under instructions from the receivers and managers of Dean-Wilson Aviation P/L and Queensland Aviation Manufacturing P/L.

A notice on the SM Aviation website states:

SM Aviation has been appointed by Price Waterhouse in Brisbane to carry out the sale of assets of Dean-Wilson Aviation and QLD Aircraft Manufacturing (receivers and managers appointed). Simon Mathews will personally oversee the sale of the business, its intellectual property and assets located at Kingaroy in Queensland, Australia.

Specifications

See also

References

External links
 Dean-Wilson Aviation Ltd
 The unlikely history of the Whitney Boomerang
 Live and Let Fly - Transcript

2000s Australian civil trainer aircraft
Low-wing aircraft
Kingaroy
Single-engined tractor aircraft
Aircraft first flown in 2006
Trainer aircraft
Aircraft manufactured in Australia